Persiaran Wawasan, Federal Route 262, is a federal road in Kangar, Perlis, Malaysia. The Perlis State Legislative Assembly Building is located at this road. The Kilometre Zero is located at Kampung Batu Hampar.

Features

Federal Route 262 was built under the JKR R5 road standard, allowing a maximum speed limit of 90 km/h.

List of junctions and towns

References

Malaysian Federal Roads
Roads in Perlis